The 2003–04 season was Stoke City's 97th season in the Football League and the 37th in the second tier.

With Stoke being successful in avoiding relegation manager Tony Pulis could begin making alterations to his squad for the 2003–04 season. A number of ins and outs followed but after a good start Stoke won just five of their first 21 matches and it seemed that another fight against relegation would be required. But after a win against West Ham United in December Stoke went nine matches unbeaten and pulled themselves away from relegation trouble. Their good form continued until the end of the season with Stoke ending a promising season of consolidation in 11th position with 66 points.

Season review

League
Manager Tony Pulis made a number of alterations to his squad in the summer of 2003 as a number of players which helped Stoke gain promotion and subsequent survival left the club and in came several new players. These included experienced goalkeeper Ed de Goey, defenders Clint Hill and John Halls, midfielders John Eustace and Darel Russell and forwards Carl Asaba and Gifton Noel-Williams whilst the most notable departures was that of James O'Connor and fan favourite Sergei Shtanuk.

Stoke began the 2003–04 season well beating Derby County 3–0 on the opening match and then Wimbledon to see Stoke sitting top of the table after two matches. But Stoke's form soon fell away and despite the return of Ade Akinbiyi Stoke won just 5 of their first 21 fixtures which ended with a 3–2 defeat at home to Cardiff City with former fan favorite Peter Thorne scoring a hat trick but such as his popularity with the club he refused to celebrate and earned a standing ovation from the Stoke supporters. With Stoke looking likely to be involved in another scrap against relegation Pulis brought in experienced no nonsense defender Gerry Taggart and in his first match he helped Stoke claim an unlikely three points away at high-flying West Ham United. This prompted Stoke's revival and in the next match Stoke beat Reading 3–0 with a hat trick from Dutch winger Peter Hoekstra.

Stoke remained unbeaten for six more matches until their run was halted by a heavy 6–3 defeat at Crystal Palace. Whilst there was some hope from the fans that Stoke could mount a late push for a play-off spot they failed to keep a consistent run of form going and ended the season in a mid-table position of 11th. It was a promising end to the season with Stoke beating all-ready promoted West Bromwich Albion 4–1 and the feeling around the club was that they could now begin to look for a promotion to the Premier League rather that worry about being relegated to the third tier.

FA Cup
Stoke drew Wimbledon in the third round who had now moved to Milton Keynes and after a bad tempered 1–1 draw at the National Hockey Stadium a free kick from Adam Nowland settled the replay.

League Cup
Stoke had a poor League Cup campaign as they narrowly beat Rochdale and were then knocked out 2–0 by Gillingham.

Final league table

Results
Stoke's score comes first

Legend

Pre-Season Friendlies

Football League First Division

FA Cup

League Cup

Squad statistics

References

Stoke City F.C. seasons
Stoke City